The São Tomé scops owl (Otus hartlaubi) is a species of owl in the true owl family, Strigidae. It is endemic to São Tomé Island, part of São Tomé and Príncipe, in the Gulf of Guinea, off the western equatorial coast of Central Africa.

Description
The São Tomé scops owl is a small, secretive owl with small ear-tufts. It has a light reddish-brown facial disc with a white chin and white eyebrows. The crown and upper-parts are chestnut with rufous wavy markings and black shaft streaks. Their scapulars have white spots and black tips. The flight feathers are buff with white mottling and narrow. There are buff bars on the tail. The underparts are rufous with fine vermiculations of brown and white and bold black streaking. Juveniles are paler. Females of the species are somewhat larger than males.

Voice 
The São Tomé scops owl's voice is a high-pitched ‘hu-hu-hu’, and also a low-pitched, raucous ‘kwow’. It differs from the African scops owl (Otus senegalensis) and the flute sounds of the Eurasian scops owl (Otus scops).

Distribution and habitat
This owl species is endemic to São Tomé Island, which is part of São Tomé and Príncipe, in the Gulf of Guinea, off the western equatorial coast of Central Africa.

This owl's natural habitats are subtropical or tropical moist lowland forest and subtropical or tropical moist montane forest where it is relatively widespread and the population is probably several hundred birds.

Behaviour
This species of owl is the only one on the island, except for the common barn owl. Its diet consists of insects, grasshoppers, beetles, moths, and small lizards. This owl is nocturnal (like most owls) and is not shy toward humans. It roosts close to tree trunks or within them. It sometimes calls during the day.

Conservation and status
The continued survival of the São Tomé scops owl depends upon stopping habitat loss in the remaining lowland rainforest of São Tomé, as does the survival of three other birds: the São Tomé ibis, São Tomé olive pigeon, and São Tomé oriole.

See also
Wildlife of São Tomé and Príncipe.

References

External links
BirdLife Species Factsheet.

São Tomé scops owl
Endemic birds of São Tomé and Príncipe
Endemic fauna of São Tomé Island
São Tomé scops owl
São Tomé scops owl
Taxonomy articles created by Polbot